The Central District of Ray County is in Tehran province, Iran. At the National Census in 2006, its population was 133,066 in 33,091 households. The following census in 2011 counted 93,006 people in 26,069 households. At the latest census in 2016, the district had 84,577 inhabitants in 25,064 households.

References 

Ray County, Iran

Districts of Tehran Province

Populated places in Tehran Province

Populated places in Ray County, Iran